Jovan Olafioye (born December 16, 1987) is a former professional Canadian football offensive lineman who most recently played for the BC Lions of the Canadian Football League. He signed with the BC Lions as a free agent, after going undrafted in the 2009 NFL Draft. Jovan attended the 2009 Detroit Lions rookie mini camp. He played junior college football at Grand Rapids Community College for a year before attending North Carolina Central University.

Professional career

BC Lions
Olafioye signed with the BC Lions on April 20, 2010, and started all 18 games en route to being named a CFL West All-Star. For the next six seasons, he again started all 18 games and was named a CFL All-Star (All Pro) every year, while also winning the CFL's Most Outstanding Offensive Lineman Award in 2012. The 7x West All Star was also a runner-up to the award in 2011 and 2015. He won his first Grey Cup championship with the Lions in 2011. Following the 2016 BC Lions season in March 2017, rumours began circulating that the Lions were seeking to deal Olafioye to the Alouettes.

St. Louis Rams
In 2012, there were as many as 15 NFL teams interested in working out Olafioye during the option year window following his second season with B.C. The St. Louis Rams guaranteed him $85,000 in base salary in the first two years. But after agreeing to terms, Olafioye’s contract was disapproved four days later when he failed his physical.

Montreal Alouettes
On March 27, 2017, Olafioye was traded to the Montreal Alouettes in exchange for the rights to Canadian lineman David Foucault and Vincent Brown. With an estimated salary of $200,000 it was reported the Lions made the deal to free up some cap space. One week after being traded to Montreal, Olafioye and the Als agreed to a 3-year contract extension through the 2019 CFL season. He played in 12 games with the Alouettes in 2017 due to injuries and was released the day before the start of 2018 training camp on May 19, 2018.

BC Lions (II)
Shortly after his release from the Alouettes, Olafioye re-signed with the BC Lions on May 19, 2018. He announced his retirement from professional football after the 2018 CFL season.

References

External links
 BC Lions profile
 Canadian Football League profile
 
 Montreal Alouettes profile

1987 births
Living people
American football offensive linemen
American players of Canadian football
BC Lions players
Canadian football offensive linemen
Grand Rapids Community College alumni
Montreal Alouettes players
North Carolina Central Eagles football players
Sportspeople from Detroit